Ilhee Lee (born 13 December 1988) is a South Korean professional golfer.

As an amateur, Lee won the 2004 Asia-Pacific Junior Championship. She turned professional in June 2006.

Lee won the 2013 Pure Silk-Bahamas LPGA Classic. She finished two shots in front of Irene Cho.

Professional wins

LPGA Tour wins (1)

LPGA Tour playoff record (0–1)

Results in LPGA majors
Results not in chronological order before 2019

^ The Evian Championship was added as a major in 2013.

CUT = missed the halfway cut
T = tied

Summary

Most consecutive cuts made – 7 (2013 Evian – 2015 ANA)
Longest streak of top-10s – 1 (twice)

References

External links

Biography on seoulsisters.com

South Korean female golfers
LPGA Tour golfers
Golfers from Seoul
Golfers from Dallas
1988 births
Living people